Vukosav Puhalović (1665–69) was a Serb hajduk commander active in the Ottoman territories of Herzegovina and southern Dalmatia during the Venetian–Ottoman war (1645–69). The hajduks, Ottoman subjects, crossed into Venetian territory from where they "jumped into" Ottoman territory. These guerilla forces closely cooperated and were recruited by the Republic of Venice to defend the Venetian–Ottoman frontier during the war. He was a comrade of acclaimed Bajo Pivljanin.

Puhalović was among the most notable hajduk leaders during the Cretan War. In early April 1669 Pivljanin and Puhalović took great loot in Herzegovina. The next month Puhalović raided Ottoman territory crossing Konavle, and returned with five heads and eleven captured Ottoman noblemen from Novi. In December 1669 Antonio Priuli brought from Perast to Venice hajduk leaders including Pivljanin, Grujica Žeravica, Puhalović and buljubaša Milošević. Earlier, in June, the Venetian provedditore issued the termination of the "chiefs that protect the Kotor area", the first three mentioned, and had them included in the list of soldiers having the right of pay and bread. He had the rank of harambaša ("bandit leader").

Vukosav Puhalović is known from Serbian epic poetry.

See also
Morlachs
Morlachs (Venetian irregulars)
Vuk Mandušić (fl. 1648), military commander in Venetian service
Stojan Janković (1636–1687), Morlach leader
Janko Mitrović
Stanislav Sočivica, Venetian rebel
Sinobad
Cvijan Šarić
Petronije Selaković
Bajo Pivljanin
Grujica Žeravica
Ilija Smiljanić
Petar Smiljanić
Vuk Močivuna
Juraj Vranić
Tadije Vranić
Petar Jagodić
Matija Žabetić
Ilija Nanić

References

Sources

17th-century Serbian people
17th-century births
17th-century deaths
Republic of Venice military personnel
Serbian military leaders
Serbs of Montenegro
Venetian period in the history of Montenegro
Hajduks
Serbs from the Ottoman Empire
Venetian Slavs
Cretan War (1645–1669)
Characters in Serbian epic poetry